Joe Grace was an Ireland international footballer.

International career
On 21 March 1926, Grace made his only appearance for the Irish Free State national football team in a 3–0 defeat to Italy in Turin.

His appearance at international level was controversial as the selectors included the former Belfast Celtic defender who was playing in the Leinster Senior League with Drumcondra at the time.

Grace had previously appeared for the Ireland amateur international team in November 1920 in a 4–0 defeat to England at  Solitude, Belfast. This was an all island team.

Club career
In 1927, Drumcondra became the first non-senior team south of the border to win the FAI Cup. They were competing in the Leinster Senior League at the time.

Grace, a tall, commanding, centre-half was hugely influential as Drumcondra defeated Brideville 1–0 in the final.

Drumcondra further enhanced their reputation and paved their way for promotion to the  League of Ireland by reaching the final again the following year losing 2-1 to Bohemians.

References

Republic of Ireland association footballers
Irish Free State association footballers
Irish Free State international footballers
League of Ireland players
Year of birth missing
Place of birth missing
Drumcondra F.C. players
1959 deaths
Association football forwards